Simone Murphy (born 29 July 1993) is a Scottish DJ, runway and fashion model, best known for placing fifth in Cycle 11 of Britain's Next Top Model.

Early life 
Born in Edinburgh, Scotland as the oldest of three children born to Jil (née Macbeth) and Frazor Murphy. Murphy attended George Heriot's School before completing a BA in Humanities and Social Science at the University of Edinburgh.

Career

Modeling 
Murphy was included as the only Scot in the twelve finalists of the eleventh series of Lifetime's Britain's Next Top Model (a spin-off of popular American series America's Next Top Model, hosted by Tyra Banks) and placed fifth despite her position as the fan favourite.

She has featured in campaigns for Citroën, Garnier, Schwarzkopf and Fiji Water. Endorsement deals include Karl Lagerfeld, Ghost Fragrances, Jose Cuervo, Good American by Khloe Kardashian and Swatch. She had worked as a presenter covering the London Fashion Film Festival as well as other events online.

In April 2017, Murphy was invited to participate in the 19th Annual Tartan Day Parade down 6th Avenue, New York City alongside Tommy Flanagan.

Starred in two music videos for rock band The 1975, 'TOOTIMETOOTIMTOOTIME' and 'Love It If We Made It' from the band's third studio album A Brief Inquiry into Online Relationships, in 2018.

Personal life 
Murphy follows a vegan lifestyle and was nominated as PETA UK's Hottest Vegan.

References

Living people
1993 births
Britain & Ireland's Next Top Model contestants